Avraham Lev (born 24 August 1948) is an Israeli former footballer. He competed in the men's tournament at the 1976 Summer Olympics.

References

External links
 
 
 
 

1948 births
Living people
Israeli footballers
Israel international footballers
Olympic footballers of Israel
Footballers at the 1976 Summer Olympics
Place of birth missing (living people)
Association football defenders
Asian Games medalists in football
Asian Games silver medalists for Israel
Footballers at the 1974 Asian Games
Medalists at the 1974 Asian Games
Hapoel Ramat Gan F.C. players
Beitar Tel Aviv F.C. players
Beitar Jerusalem F.C. players
Hapoel Kfar Saba F.C. players
Bnei Yehuda Tel Aviv F.C. players
Maccabi Jaffa F.C. players
Hapoel Lod F.C. players